Ratna "Elie" Mohini (17 May 1904 in Batavia – 24 October 1988 in Paris) was a Javanese dancer who was the wife of the French photographer Henri Cartier-Bresson from 1937 to 1967.

She was born in Batavia as Carolina Jeanne de Souza-IJke. Ratna was known as "Elie" to her friends. Between 1930 and 1935 she was married to the Dutch journalist Willem L. Berretty.

Cartier-Bresson and Mohini divorced in 1967, after 30 years of marriage, and Cartier-Bresson then married the photographer Martine Franck in 1970.

References

1904 births
1988 deaths
Indonesian female dancers
Javanese people
French female dancers
Indo people
People from Batavia, Dutch East Indies
20th-century French women
Indonesian emigrants to France